Simon Lambert (born 17 April 1988) is a hurler for Dublin and Ballyboden St Enda's. He won a Dublin Senior Hurling Championship medal with Ballyboden in 2007. Lambert was dropped from the Dublin hurling panel in December 2015.

Lambert was a member of the Ballyboden St Enda's football team that won the 2015–16 All-Ireland Senior Club Football Championship.

References 

1988 births
Living people
Ballyboden St Enda's Gaelic footballers
Ballyboden St Enda's hurlers
Dual players
Dublin inter-county hurlers